HMS K17 was a British K class submarine built by Vickers in Barrow-in-Furness.

Design
Like all British K-class submarines, the submarine had a displacement of  when at the surface and  while submerged. The submarine was powered by two oil-fired Yarrow Shipbuilders boilers and one geared Brown-Curtis or Parsons steam turbine; this developed 10,500 ship horsepower (7,800 kW) to drive two  screws. The hull contained four electric motors each producing . The vessel was also fitted with a diesel engine providing  to be used when steam was being generated.

The vessels armament comprised a  anti-aircraft gun, ten  torpedo tubes, and two  deck guns. The torpedo tubes were fitted to the bows, the midship section, and two were mounted on the deck. Its complement was fifty-nine crew members.

Loss
K17 was sunk on 31 January 1918 during the night time fleet exercises later known as the Battle of May Island (Operation E.C.1) when she was attached to the 13th Submarine Flotilla.  ploughed into K17 at the head of a line of submarines. She sank in about 8 minutes with the loss of all hands.  The wreck is designated as a protected place under the Protection of Military Remains Act 1986.

References

Bibliography

External links
 wrecksite.eu : HMS K-17

 

Ships built in Barrow-in-Furness
British K-class submarines
Protected Wrecks of Scotland
World War I shipwrecks in the North Sea
British submarine accidents
Maritime incidents in 1918
Submarines sunk in collisions
1918 in Scotland
Royal Navy ship names
1917 ships
Warships lost with all hands